is a Japanese former badminton player. She began playing badminton at age 9, and played competitively from then on. She became a member of the Japan national badminton team at the age of 19. Her current partner is Naru Shinoya for women's doubles and Kohei Gondo for mixed doubles. Kurihara competed with her former partner Kenta Kazuno in the mixed doubles at the 2016 Summer Olympics in Rio de Janeiro, Brazil.

Kurihara announced her retirement through her Twitter account on 23 December 2019.

Achievements

BWF World Tour (1 title, 1 runner-up) 
The BWF World Tour, which was announced on 19 March 2017 and implemented in 2018, is a series of elite badminton tournaments sanctioned by the Badminton World Federation (BWF). The BWF World Tour is divided into levels of World Tour Finals, Super 1000, Super 750, Super 500, Super 300 (part of the HSBC World Tour), and the BWF Tour Super 100.

Women's doubles

Mixed doubles

BWF Grand Prix (1 title, 3 runners-up) 
The BWF Grand Prix had two levels, the Grand Prix and Grand Prix Gold. It was a series of badminton tournaments sanctioned by the Badminton World Federation (BWF) and played between 2007 and 2017.

Women's singles

Women's doubles

  BWF Grand Prix Gold tournament
  BWF Grand Prix tournament

BWF International Challenge/Series (5 titles, 3 runners-up) 
Women's singles

Women's doubles

Mixed doubles

  BWF International Challenge tournament
  BWF International Series tournament
  BWF Future Series tournament

References

External links 
 
 
 
 

1989 births
Living people
Sportspeople from Kitakyushu
Japanese female badminton players
Badminton players at the 2016 Summer Olympics
Olympic badminton players of Japan